The Football League Third Division Manager of the Month award was a monthly prize of recognition given to association football managers in the Football League Third Division, the fourth tier of English football from 1992 to 2004. The award was announced in the first week of the following month. From the 2004–05 season onwards, following a rebranding exercise by The Football League, the third tier was known as Football League Two, thus the award became the Football League Two Manager of the Month award. The awards are designed and manufactured in the UK by bespoke awards company Gaudio Awards.

Winners

2000–01

2001–02

2002–03

2003–04

Later results

References

External links
Manager of the Month at the League Managers Association
Bespoke Award Manufacturers

English Football League trophies and awards
Manager of the Month